"Lose Myself" is a 2007 song by American singer/rapper Ms. Lauryn Hill.  It is included on the soundtrack to Surf's Up, released on June 5, 2007.  The song is played at the end of the movie when the credits roll.

The song relates Hill's love for music and Big Z's from Surf's Up passion for surfing.

She sang, wrote, and produced the song using a more Hawaii/surfing feel to go along with movie. It is her first completely new solo song released since 2004 when she appeared on The Passion of the Christ: Songs soundtrack with "The Passion".

Marsha Ambrosius covered the song for her 2011 debut Late Nights and Early Mornings.

References

Lauryn Hill songs
2007 singles
2007 songs
Songs written by Lauryn Hill